The Neil George Safety System (or 5-Point Safety System) is an occupational health and safety program developed, used in underground mining. The system was developed in 1942 by Canadian engineer Neil George, who at the time was an employee of Inco Limited in Sudbury, Ontario. The program is used throughout Canada and internationally.

The program is made up of five components:
Check entrance and travelway to workplace.
Are workplace and equipment in good working order?
Are employees working properly?
Do an act of safety.
Can and will employees continue to work properly?

Points one through three are done by the employee, and verified by the supervisor upon arrival to the workplace. The fourth step is safety discussion between the employee and the supervisor, while the fifth is a verification by the employee that he or she has the correct training, experience, and motivation to continue working safely. This is also verified by the supervisor prior to his or her leaving the workplace.

Notes

Occupational safety and health
Underground mining